Cornufer paepkei is a species of frog in the family Ceratobatrachidae, endemic to rainforest habitat.  Scientitsts know it exclusively from the type locality: the Fakfak Mountains in Indonesia, between 400 and 860 meters above sea level.

The adult frog measures 21.6 to 31.4 mm in snout-urostyle length.  Its voice sounds like a "low, short creak." There a small amount of webbed skin on its feet.  The frog is yellow-brown in color with dark brown or black patterning.  There are two yellow-white lines from its nose to its hind legs.  The backs of the legs are red-brown in color.  Other parts of the legs are almost purple.  The ventrum is off-white.

References

Frogs of Asia
Endemic fauna of Indonesia
Amphibians described in 2015
papekei